Artur Ullrich (born 10 October 1957) is a retired footballer from East Germany. Ullrich began to play football for SG Dynamo Berlin-Mitte. He joined the youth academy of BFC Dynamo in 1969. Ullrich played professionally for BFC Dynamo and Hansa Rostock in the DDR-Oberliga. The defender represented East Germany between 1980 and 1983 in 13 matches. At the 1980 Olympics he competed with the East German Olympic squad and won the silver medal with his team in Moscow. Together with his teammates, he was awarded the Patriotic Order of Merit in bronze the same year.

References

External links
 
 
 
 
 

1957 births
Living people
German footballers
East German footballers
Footballers at the 1980 Summer Olympics
Olympic footballers of East Germany
Olympic silver medalists for East Germany
Berliner FC Dynamo players
Sportspeople from Arkhangelsk
People from East Berlin
Footballers from Berlin
Olympic medalists in football
DDR-Oberliga players
Medalists at the 1980 Summer Olympics
Recipients of the Patriotic Order of Merit
German footballers needing infoboxes
Association football defenders
East Germany international footballers
FC Hansa Rostock players